The 2010-11 Coppa Titano was the fifty-third season of San Marino's oldest football competition. It began on 11 September 2010 with the first games of the Group Stage and ended in 2011 with the Final held at Stadio Olimpico, Serravalle. Tre Fiori were the defending champions, having won their sixth cup final last season.

The winner of the cup final will enter the second qualifying round of UEFA Europa League.

Competition format
The competition consisted of two stages, the Group Stage and the Elimination Rounds. The Group Stage consisted of three groups with five teams each. Every team played two games (once "home" and once "away") against every other team of its group. The top two teams from each group, as well as the two best third-placed teams, qualified for the Elimination Rounds. The Elimination Rounds was a single-game elimination tournament. Games in the Elimination Rounds were decided by extra time and, if necessary, a penalty shootout.

Group stage

Group A

Group B

Group C

Elimination rounds

Quarterfinals
These matches took place on 21 April 2011.

Semifinals
These matches took place on 26 April 2011.

Final

References

External links
 Official website 

Coppa Titano seasons
San Marino
Coppa